The Westphalia Cup is a German football club Cup competition open to teams from the Westphalia region of the North Rhine-Westphalia state. The competition in its existing format is relatively new compared to many other regional cups in Germany. It is one of the 21 regional cup competitions in Germany. The competition also acts as a qualifier to the following seasons' German Cup.

Winners

Pre-1981
There are very few records of the competition prior to 1981, however, the following winners are known:
 1908: Arminia Bielefeld
 1932: Arminia Bielefeld
 1943: FC Schalke 04
 1944: FC Schalke 04
 1947: Borussia Dortmund

Post-1981
The winners since 1981:

References

Sources
Deutschlands Fußball in Zahlen,  An annual publication with tables and results from the Bundesliga to Verbandsliga/Landesliga, publisher: DSFS

External links
Fussball.de: Westphalia Cup 
Krombacher Pokal  FLVW website

Football cup competitions in Germany
Football competitions in North Rhine-Westphalia